Stephen Li-Chung Kuo (born July 27, 1990) is a Taiwanese-American figure skater who represented Taiwan in men's singles. He is a two-time Taiwanese national champion (2010–2011) and competed in the free skate at three ISU Championships.

Personal life 
Kuo was born on July 27, 1990, in Trenton, New Jersey. His hobbies include juggling with a specialty in Diabolo, playing violin, and reading.

Skating career 
Kuo was coached by Roland Burghart in Monmouth Junction, New Jersey, and represented Taiwan. He made his international debut at the 2009 World Junior Championships in Sofia, Bulgaria; he placed 27th in the short program and did not advance further. His first senior international was the 2009 Nebelhorn Trophy in Oberstdorf, Germany.

Kuo won two senior national titles and competed in the final segment at three ISU Championships — 2010 Four Continents in Jeonju, South Korea; 2010 Junior Worlds in The Hague, Netherlands; and 2011 Four Continents in Taipei, Taiwan. He also competed at two World Championships but did not reach the free skate.

Kuo was a member of the founding executive board for Rutgers University Figure Skating Club, has additionally passed both Gold USFS Free Skate and Gold USFS Moves in the Field tests and now coaches figure skating domestically.

Competitive highlights

Programs

References

External links 

 

Taiwanese male single skaters
Living people
1990 births
Sportspeople from Morris County, New Jersey
Sportspeople from Trenton, New Jersey
Sportspeople from Middlesex County, New Jersey
People from Piscataway, New Jersey